The Lawrentian is the campus newspaper of Lawrence University in Appleton, Wisconsin. The paper, first published in 1884, comes out once per week while school is in session. Although it is student operated, it receives university funding.

The Lawrentian was first published in May 1884 by a committee representing four literary societies at Lawrence University: the Philalathean, and Phoenix ("gentlemen's societies"); and the Athena and Lawrean ("ladies' societies"). Prior to The Lawrentian, the Phoenix Society had published a newspaper called The Collegian from 1867 to 1878, while the Philalathean and Athena societies published The Neoterian from 1876 to 1878. The two newspapers were merged as The Collegian and Neoterian in 1878, and was reorganized as The Lawrentian in 1884.

References

External links 
The Lawrentian

Lawrence University
Publications established in 1884
Student newspapers published in Wisconsin
1884 establishments in Wisconsin